Arnold Barboza Jr. (born December 9, 1991) is an American professional boxer. As of July 2022, he is ranked as the world's seventh-best active light welterweight by The Ring.

Professional career
Barboza made his professional debut as a welterweight on June 14, 2013, scoring a six-round unanimous decision (UD) victory against Gustavo Lopez at the Chumash Casino Resort in Santa Ynez, California.

After compiling a record of 19–0 (7 KOs) he defeated Manuel Lopez via ten-round UD on December 14, 2018, capturing the vacant WBC-NABF Junior light welterweight title at the American Bank Center in Corpus Christi, Texas. All three judges scored the bout 100–90. Barboza scored another three victories in 2019; a third-round knockout (KO) to retain his title against former world title challenger Mike Alvarado in April; a fourth-round stoppage via corner retirement (RTD) against Ricky Sismundo in a non-title bout in August; and a second successful defence of his title against William Silva via fifth-round KO in November.

Barboza Jr. faced Tony Luis on August 29, 2020, in his first fight of the year. He won the bout by unanimous decision, with all three judges scoring the fight 99–90 in his favor. Barboza Jr. was booked to face the one-time WBO light welterweight title challenger Alex Saucedo for the vacant WBO International light welterweight title on October 17, 2020. He won the fight by unanimous decision, with scores of 96–93, 97–92 and 97–92.

Barboza made his first WBO International title defense against Antonio Moran on August 14, 2021, on the undercard of the Joshua Franco and Andrew Moloney trilogy bout. He won the fight by a dominant unanimous decision, with scores of 99–91, 100–90 and 99–91.

Professional boxing record

References

1991 births
Living people
American male boxers
Boxers from California
Sportspeople from Long Beach, California
Light-welterweight boxers
Welterweight boxers